The Komatsu D475A is the second largest bulldozer in the Komatsu line after the D575A, the world's largest production bulldozer. There are several versions of the D475A that are  used in surface mining, open-pit mining, quarries and construction worldwide.

The  D475A-1 was introduced in 1986 as a replacement for the  D455A.

See also
 Komatsu D575A
 Caterpillar D10
 Caterpillar D11

References

External links
 Komatsu America Corp. D475A-5 Tier 2 product page (archived on 2010-10-26)
 Komatsu D475A-5 With Tier 2 Engine Product Brochure AESS724-00 04/06 (EV-1) (archived on 2010-10-26)
 Dozer's Guide

Komatsu vehicles
Komatsu bulldozers
Tracked vehicles
Bulldozers over 100 tonne
Bulldozers with powerplants larger than 500kW